Federica Brunetti (born October 6, 1988) is an Italian professional basketball player.

She is a power forward and she has played in CUS Cagliari Pallacanestro, in A1 league.

References

External links
 http://lbf-web.dataproject-stats.com/DettaglioAtleta.asp?IdAtleta=474 

1988 births
Living people
Italian women's basketball players
21st-century Italian women